Frederick Harold Ewer (30 September 1898 – 29 January 1971) was an English international footballer, who played as a wing half.

Career
Born in West Ham, Ewer played for Corinthian in the 1927 FA Charity Shield, where they lost against Cardiff City. He also played for Casuals, and earned two caps for England in 1928. He played for the "Amateurs" in the 1929 FA Charity Shield.

References

1898 births
1971 deaths
English footballers
England international footballers
Casuals F.C. players
Corinthian F.C. players
Association football midfielders